Gracilorrhina is a genus of long-beaked fungus gnats in the family Lygistorrhinidae.

Species
G. gracilis Hippa, Mattsson & Vilkamaa, 2005

References

Sciaroidea genera